Nesoxenica is a monotypic butterfly genus of the subfamily Satyrinae in the family Nymphalidae. Its single species is Nesoxenica leprea.

References

Satyrini
Monotypic butterfly genera